Meoswar is an Austronesian language of Cenderawasih Bay in the province of West Papua, Indonesia.

References

South Halmahera–West New Guinea languages
Languages of western New Guinea
Cenderawasih Bay
Papua (province) culture